Shāh Ashraf Hotak, (died 1730), also known as Shāh Ashraf Ghiljī, son of Abdul Aziz Hotak, was the fourth ruler of the Hotak dynasty. An Afghan from the Ghilji Pashtuns, he served as a commander in the army of Mahmud Hotak during his revolt against the heavily declining Safavid Persians. Ashraf also participated in the Battle of Gulnabad. In 1725, he briefly succeeded to the throne to become Shah of Persia after he killed his cousin Mahmud.

The nephew of Mirwais Hotak, his reign was noted for the sudden decline in the Hotak tribal rule under increasing pressure from the two great powers of the time Turkish, Russian, and Persian forces.

Ashraf Khan halted both the Russian and Turkish onslaughts. He defeated the Ottoman Empire, who wanted to reestablish their former arch rivals, the Safavids, back on the throne, in a battle near Kermanshah after the enemy had come close to Isfahan. This led to peace negotiations with the Sublime Porte, which were briefly disrupted after Ashraf's ambassador insisted his master should be Caliph of the East and the Ottoman Sultan Caliph of the West. This caused great umbrage to the Ottomans, but a peace agreement was finally signed (Treaty of Hamedan) due to superior Ottoman diplomacy in October 1727.

Ultimately, the royal Persian army of Shah Tahmasp II (One of the Shah Sultan Husayn's sons) under the leadership of Nader defeated Ashraf's Ghilji forces in a decisive battle known as the Battle of Damghan in October 1729, banishing and driving out the Afghans back to what is now Afghanistan.

Death
When escaping from Persia, Ashraf was captured and murdered by the Baloch Khan of Kalat Mir Mohabbat Khan Baloch in 1730.

Ashraf Khan's death marked the end of Hotak rule in Persia, but the country of Afghanistan was still under Shah Hussain Hotak's control until Nader Shah's 1738 conquest of Kandahar, where the young Ahmad Shah Durrani was held prisoner. There was only a short pause before the establishment of the last Afghan Empire (modern state of Afghanistan) by Ahmad Shah Durrani in 1747.

See also
Ottoman–Hotaki War (1722–1727)
History of Iran
History of Afghanistan

References

Further reading
 
 
 
 

1730 deaths
18th-century Afghan monarchs
18th-century monarchs of Persia
Pashtun people
People from Kandahar
Usurpers
Executed monarchs
Year of birth unknown
Hotak dynasty